The women's tournament for the 2022 Rugby World Cup Sevens was held in Cape Town, South Africa from September 9 to 11 at the Cape Town Stadium.

Teams 

The four semi-finalists from the 2018 Rugby World Cup Sevens were automatic qualifiers, with South Africa also qualifying as host. The remaining eleven places were decided in the six continental regions.

Notes

Draw
The ten core teams from the World Rugby Sevens Series were seeded according to their points accumulated across the 2019–20 and 2021–22 seasons.

The remaining six teams were seeded based on regional ranking positions in July 2022.

Format
Like the previous edition, the tournament was played using a knock-out format.
 Teams in the Championship Cup competed for the Rugby Sevens World Cup trophy and gold, silver and bronze medals.
 Losing teams in the Championship Cup quarterfinals played off for 5th to 8th place.
 Losing teams in the Championship Cup Round of 16 (first round) competed for the Challenge Trophy and lower places.
 All teams played four matches.

Tournament
Match results as per the official website:

All times are local (UTC+2).

13th place

Challenge Trophy

5th place

Championship Cup

Final placings

Player scoring

Source:

See also
 2022 Rugby World Cup Sevens – Men's tournament

References

Women